This is a list of musical artists who are part of the National Socialist black metal scene. National Socialist black metal (usually shortened to NSBM, and also known as neo-Nazi black metal or Aryan black metal) is a political movement within black metal music that promotes neo-Nazism and similar fascist or far-right ideologies. NSBM artists typically combine neo-Nazi imagery and ideology with ethnic European paganism, Satanism, or Nazi occultism, or a combination there of, and vehemently oppose Christianity, Islam and Judaism. NSBM is not seen as a distinct genre, but as a völkisch movement within black metal. Additionally, a number of black metal bands and musicians who may not explicitly promote neo-Nazi or fascist ideology in their lyrics maintain close ties with other NSBM bands, labels, and neo-Nazi or right-wing extremist organizations, or otherwise espoused neo-Nazi or extreme right wing ideology in their personal lives. All entries in this list have been explicitly mentioned as being part of the NSBM scene in reliable sources.

A 
 Absurd
Abusiveness
Abyssic Hate
 Adolfkult
 Aryan Blood
 Aryan Terrorism
 Astrofaes

B 
 Baise ma Hache
 Bannerwar
 Before God
 Bilskirnir
 Blutkult
 Branikald
 Burzum

C 
 Capricornus

D 
 Dark Fury
 Der Stürmer
 Deprimat
Die Glocke

E 
 Eisenwinter
 Eugenik
 Evil

F 
 Forest

G 
 Gaszimmer
 Gestapo 666
 Gestapo SS
 Gontyna Kry
 Grand Belial's Key
 Graveland
 Grom
 Goatmoon

H 
 Hagl

I 
 Infernal War/Infernal SS
 Ifernach
 Infernum

K 
 Kalmankantaja
 Kataxu
 Kristallnacht
 Kroda

L 
 Legion of Doom
 Leichenzug
 Lord Wind

M 

 М8Л8ТХ
 Menneskerhat
Maeströ Cröque Mört

N 
 Naer Mataron
 Nacht Und Nebel
 Nezhegol
 Nitberg
 Nokturnal Mortum
 Nuova Littoria

P 
 Patris
 Peste Noire

R 
 Reich of the Black Sun

S 
 Seigneur Voland
 Selbstmord
 Shepot run
 
 Spear of Longinus
 Stahlfront
 Stutthof
 Stürm Kommand
 Sunwheel
 Svarga
 Sudentaival

T 
 Temnozor
 Thor's Hammer
 Thunderbolt (until circa 2000)
 The True Frost
 Totenburg

U 
 Ulfhethnar

V 
 Veles
 Velimor
 Via Dolorosa

W 
 Wehrhammer
 Wodulf
 Wolfnacht

See also 
 Asgardsrei festival
 List of neo-Nazi bands
 Rock Against Communism
 Nazi punk
 White power music
 White power skinhead

Notes

References 

Lists of black metal bands